The 1993 Tulsa Golden Hurricane football team represented the University of Tulsa in the 1993 NCAA Division I-A football season. The Golden Hurricane was led by sixth-year head coach David Rader and played their home games at Skelly Stadium.

Schedule

Roster

Coaching staff

Team players in the 1994 NFL Draft

References

Tulsa
Tulsa Golden Hurricane football seasons
Tulsa Golden Hurricane football